Cnemaspis tucdupensis, also known as the Tuc Dup Hill rock gecko, is a species of gecko endemic to southern Vietnam.

References

tucdupensis
Lizards of Asia
Reptiles described in 2007